FK Kunice is a Czech football club located in Kunice. It currently plays in the 1.B třída skupina D at the seventh level of Czech football. The club won Group A in the Czech Fourth Division in the 2009–10 season.

Honours
Czech Fourth Division (Group A)
 Champions 2009–10

References

External links
  

Football clubs in the Czech Republic
Association football clubs established in 1934
Prague-East District